The Wanters is a 1923 American silent society drama film produced by Louis B. Mayer, directed by John M. Stahl and distributed by Associated First National Pictures, which became First National Pictures in 1924. The film stars Marie Prevost, Robert Ellis, and Norma Shearer.

Plot
As described in a film magazine review, Elliot Worthington falls in love with and weds Myra Hastings, the maid to his wealthy sister Mrs. Van Pelt. Myra is coldly received in society. Shocked by the hypocrisy and infidelities of the society men and women she encounters, she leaves. Her husband, who really loves her, follows and saves her when her foot becomes lodged in a railroad track switch. They are reconciled and face a happy future together.

Cast

Preservation
With no prints of The Wanters located in any film archives, it is a lost film.

See also
Gertrude Astor filmography

References

External links

Stills at normashearer.com

1923 films
1923 drama films
1923 lost films
Silent American drama films
American silent feature films
American black-and-white films
Films directed by John M. Stahl
First National Pictures films
Films produced by Louis B. Mayer
Lost American films
Lost drama films
1920s American films